The 1966–67 NBA season was the Celtics' 21st season in the NBA. The Celtics finished the season with a 60-21 record, the second best in the league. However, they lost to the Philadelphia 76ers in the Eastern Conference Finals 4 games to 1.

Draft picks

This table only displays picks through the second round.

Roster

Regular season

Season standings

Record vs. opponents

Game log

Playoffs

|- align="center" bgcolor="#ccffcc"
| 1
| March 21
| New York
| W 140–110
| Sam Jones (38)
| Bill Russell (23)
| Bill Russell (8)
| Boston Garden8,632
| 1–0
|- align="center" bgcolor="#ccffcc"
| 2
| March 25
| @ New York
| W 115–108
| Sam Jones (26)
| Bill Russell (18)
| Larry Siegfried (8)
| Madison Square Garden III10,009
| 2–0
|- align="center" bgcolor="#ffcccc"
| 3
| March 26
| New York
| L 112–123
| John Havlicek (29)
| Bill Russell (24)
| K. C. Jones (5)
| Boston Garden10,738
| 2–1
|- align="center" bgcolor="#ccffcc"
| 4
| March 28
| @ New York
| W 118–109
| Sam Jones (51)
| Bill Russell (16)
| K. C. Jones (7)
| Madison Square Garden III17,173
| 3–1
|-

|- align="center" bgcolor="#ffcccc"
| 1
| March 31
| @ Philadelphia
| L 113–127
| Sam Jones (24)
| Bill Russell (15)
| Sam Jones (12)
| Philadelphia Convention Hall9,239
| 0–1
|- align="center" bgcolor="#ffcccc"
| 2
| April 2
| Philadelphia
| L 102–107
| John Havlicek (26)
| Bill Russell (24)
| K. C. Jones (7)
| Boston Garden13,909
| 0–2
|- align="center" bgcolor="#ffcccc"
| 3
| April 5
| @ Philadelphia
| L 104–115
| John Havlicek (33)
| Bill Russell (29)
| Bill Russell (9)
| Philadelphia Convention Hall13,007
| 0–3
|- align="center" bgcolor="#ccffcc"
| 4
| April 9
| Philadelphia
| W 121–117
| Sam Jones (32)
| Bill Russell (28)
| Larry Siegfried (11)
| Boston Garden13,909
| 1–3
|- align="center" bgcolor="#ffcccc"
| 5
| April 11
| @ Philadelphia
| L 116–140
| John Havlicek (38)
| Bill Russell (21)
| Larry Siegfried (8)
| Philadelphia Convention Hall13,007
| 1–4
|-

Awards and records
Bill Russell, All-NBA Second Team
Sam Jones, All-NBA Second Team

References

Boston Celtics seasons
Boston Celtics
Boston Celtics
Boston Celtics
1960s in Boston